Rygnestad is a village in Valle municipality in Agder county, Norway. The village is located along the Norwegian National Road 9 in the Setesdal valley. The Rygnestadtunet museum is located just north of the village.

References

Villages in Agder
Valle, Norway